Nataša Mladenovska (born 12 February 1986 in Kumanovo, Socialist Republic of Macedonia) is a Macedonian handball player who currently plays for ŽRK Metalurg and for the North Macedonia women's national handball team. 

She plays on the position line player-pivot.

In the season 2010/11, playing for ŽRK Metalurg, she made it to the Last 16 of the Women's EHF Cup Winners' Cup.

References

External links
Sport195 Profile
WRHL Profile

1986 births
Living people
Macedonian female handball players
Sportspeople from Kumanovo